Prostanthera behriana, commonly known as tall mintbush, is a species of flowering plant in the family Lamiaceae and is endemic to the south-east of South Australia. It is an erect to straggling shrub with egg-shaped leaves and white, pale blue, pale violet or purplish white flowers with red-brown spots or purple streaks inside.

Description

Taxonomy
Prostanthera behriana was first formally described in 1847 by Schlechtendal in the journal Linnaea from specimens collected by Hans Hermann Behr.

Distribution and habitat
Tall mintbush grows in heath and woodland from the lower Flinders Ranges, through the Mount Lofty Ranges to south of Keith.

References

behriana
Flora of South Australia
Lamiales of Australia
Taxa named by Diederich Franz Leonhard von Schlechtendal
Plants described in 1847